Nationwide Communications Inc., originally known as Peoples Broadcasting Corporation, was a media subsidiary of the Nationwide Insurance Company, which operated from 1946 until 1997.  Based in Columbus, Ohio, Nationwide Communications owned and operated a variety of radio and television stations across the United States until it sold off all its radio stations to Cincinnati-based Jacor for a reported $620 million, and its television stations to Young Broadcasting. The service division was spun off and became Nationwide Communications Services L.L.C. in 1998.

In 1946, the Ohio Farm Bureau Federation first got into broadcasting through a radio service for farmers on WRFD, Columbus, Ohio, an AM radio station.  The Ohio Farm Bureau was dedicated to serving farmers in Ohio, but as its other pursuits (chiefly the Farm Bureau Mutual Automobile Insurance Company) were increasingly made available to non-farmers, the Farm Bureau spun off these ventures into a separate corporation.  WRFD continued to serve farmers, and indeed, still carries farm programming today under the ownership of Salem Media of Ohio.  However, other Farm Bureau stations—most notably WRFD-FM, now known as WNCI—were transferred to this umbrella corporation, known today as the Nationwide Mutual Insurance Company & Affiliated Companies.  The group of stations became known as Nationwide Communications, after its parent company.

Nationwide Communications owned a total of five television stations, though none in its home market of Columbus, or Ohio.  The first television station it owned was KVTV-TV (now KCAU-TV) in Sioux City, Iowa, which was sold in 1965 to purchase WATE-TV, Channel 6, Knoxville, Tennessee.  The company's second purchase was WXEX-TV (now WRIC-TV), Channel 8, Petersburg, Virginia in 1968, its third station was WBAY-TV, Channel 2, Green Bay, Wisconsin, purchased in 1974, and its fourth station purchase was KITN (now WFTC), Channel 29, in Minneapolis in 1985.   Three of the four stations were ABC affiliates (WXEX-TV switched from NBC to ABC in 1965, WATE-TV switched from NBC to ABC in 1979, and WBAY-TV switched from CBS to ABC in 1992); the fourth (KITN/WFTC) was an independent and later a Fox affiliate while under Nationwide's stewardship.  Nationwide Communications sold all three of its ABC-affiliated television stations in 1993 to Young Broadcasting, a subsidiary of Adam Young, Incorporated, a TV station advertising representation firm; WFTC was sold to Clear Channel Communications the next year. In November 2013, Young merged with Media General, and then itself was merged with Nexstar Media Group in January 2017. WATE and WRIC are now under that company's ownership, while WBAY was spun-off to Gray Television.

In the early 1970s, Nationwide was awarded a license to operate a UHF television station in Columbus, Ohio, on channel 28, with the assigned call letters WNCI-TV. Nationwide, however, did not complete construction of the television station and its license and construction permit was allowed to lapse. The frequency allocation was ultimately awarded to Commercial Radio Institute, Inc. of Baltimore, Maryland, which began operation of WTTE. WTTE was the second station owned by the company now known as the Sinclair Broadcast Group.

Before ceasing operations, Nationwide Communications was the 16th largest radio group in the United States. Throughout its history, Nationwide owned and operated radio stations in Minnesota, Florida, Ohio, Nevada, Texas, Arizona, Maryland, North Carolina, Virginia, Washington and California.

List of former assets

Radio Stations 

Note: All call letters are listed in chronological order—from the left being the oldest to the right being the most recent—during the time a station was owned by Nationwide. Also, stations signed on and built by Nationwide directly are indicated with a spade (♠).

AM Stations

FM Stations

Television Stations 

Note: All call letters are listed in chronological order—from the left being the oldest to the right being the most recent—during the time a station was owned by Nationwide. Also, stations signed on and built by Nationwide directly are indicated with a diamond (♦).

References 

 
1946 establishments in Ohio
Mass media companies established in 1946
Mass media companies disestablished in 1997
Defunct radio broadcasting companies of the United States
Defunct broadcasting companies of the United States
Defunct television broadcasting companies of the United States
1997 disestablishments in Ohio